The Last Tudor is a historical novel by British author Philippa Gregory, published on 9 August 2016. It recounts the story of Lady Mary Grey, the 'last Tudor' and sister to Jane Grey who was Queen of England for nine days, and Lady Katherine Grey who sought to produce a royal heir before both met the executioner.

References

External links 
  

2017 British novels
Novels by Philippa Gregory
Novels set in Tudor England
Simon & Schuster books